Edwill Charl van der Merwe (born 12 April 1996) is a South African rugby union player for the  in United Rugby Championship and  in the Currie Cup and the Rugby Challenge. His regular position is wing.

References

South African rugby union players
Living people
1996 births
People from Stellenbosch
Rugby union wings
Stormers players
Western Province (rugby union) players
South Africa Under-20 international rugby union players
Lions (United Rugby Championship) players
Rugby union players from the Western Cape
Golden Lions players